The P'yŏngra Line is an electrified standard-gauge trunk line of the Korean State Railway in North Korea, running from P'yŏngyang to Rason, where it connects with the Hambuk Line. It is North Korea's main northeast–southwest rail line.

History

P'yŏngwon Line

Hamgyŏng Line 

The  section from Kowŏn to Kŭmya was originally opened by the Chosen Government Railway (Sentetsu) on 21 July 1916 as part of its Hamgyŏng Line.

Ch'ŏngra Line 
The Ch'ŏngra Line was the name of a line planned by Sentetsu to run from Ch'ŏngjin to Rajin. On 1 February 1945 the Ch'ongjin−Ch'ongam section was opened, however due to the defeat of Japan in the Pacific War, Sentetsu was unable to complete the remainder of the line. After the end of the Korean War, construction of the line was resumed with the support of People's Republic of China and the Soviet Union, being completed on 10 June 1965. 

Later, the P'yŏngwon Line, the Ch'ŏngra Line, and the Kowŏn−Ch'ŏngjin section of the Hamgyŏng Line were merged to create the P'yŏngra Line. With the construction of a new section between Kalli and Paesanjŏm the Ryongsŏng Line was separated from the former P'yŏngwon Line; in 1993 construction of the bypass between Puraesan and Kowŏn was completed.

Services

The following passenger trains were scheduled on this line in the 2002 passenger timetable:

 Express trains 1/2, operating between P'yŏngyang and Hyesan Ch'ŏngnyŏn, run on this line between P'yŏngyang and Kilju;
 Express trains 3/4, operating between West P'yŏngyang and Hyesan Ch'ŏngnyŏn, run on this line between P'yŏngyang and Kilju;
 Express trains 7/8, operating between P'yŏngyang and Tumangang and Moscow, run on this line between P'yŏngyang and Rajin;
 Express trains 9/10, operating between P'yŏngyang and Musan, run on this line between P'yŏngyang and Ch'ŏngjin;
 Express trains 11/12, operating between P'yŏngyang and Kŭmgol, run on this line between P'yŏngyang and Yŏhaejin;
 Express trains 13/14, operating between P'yŏngyang and P'yŏnggang, run on this line between P'yŏngyang and Kowŏn;
 Semi-express trains 104-107/108-111, operating between Haeju Ch'ŏngnyŏn and Manp'o Ch'ŏngnyŏn, run on this line between P'yŏngyang and Sunch'ŏn;
 Semi-express trains 113/114, operating between West P'yŏngyang and Unsŏng, run on this line between West P'yŏngyang and Ch'ŏngjin;
 Semi-express trains 117/118, operating between Taedonggang and P'yŏnggang, run on this line between Sinsŏngch'ŏn and Kowŏn;
 Semi-express trains 119-122/120-121, operating between Sinch'ŏn and Ch'ŏngjin Ch'ŏngnyŏn, via the P'yŏngra Line and the Ŭnnyul Line, run on this line between P'yŏngyang and Ch'ŏngjin and taking three days to travel each way;
 Semi-express trains 124-125/126-127, operating between Sinŭiju Ch'ŏngnyŏn and Ch'ŏngjin Ch'ŏngnyŏn, run on this line between P'yŏngyang and Ch'ŏngjin;
 Semi-express trains 128-129-130/131-132-133, operating between Kalma and Rajin, run on this line between Kowŏn and Rajin;
 Semi-express trains 134-135/136-137, operating between Manp'o Ch'ŏngnyŏn and Hamhŭng, run on this line between Sunch'ŏn and Hamhŭng;
 Regional trains 202-203-204/205-206-207, operating between Hamhŭng and Sariwŏn, run on this line between Hamhŭng and P'yŏngyang;
 Regional trains 261/262, operating between Hamhŭng and Samgi, run on this line between Ham and Sinbukch'ŏn;
 Regional trains 263/264 operate between Hamhŭng and Tanch'ŏn Ch'ŏngnyŏn;
 Local trains 311/312 and 313/314 operate between P'yŏngyang and Paesanjŏm - these trains, intended for commuter use by scientists, are operated with the Juche-class EMU;
 Local trains 331/332 operate between Sunch'ŏn and Ŭnsan;
 Local trains 335/336 operate between Sunch'ŏn and Ch'ŏnsŏng on the Ch'ŏnsŏng Colliery Line via Sinch'ang;
 Local trains 551/556, operating between Kokku and Tongdae, run on this line between Kokku and Tanch'ŏn;
 Local trains 601/604, operating between Ch'ŏngjin Ch'ŏngnyŏn and Kŭndong, run on this line between Ch'ŏngjin and Namgangdŏk;
 Local trains 602/615 operate between Ch'ŏngjin Ch'ŏngnyŏn and Ranam;
 Local trains 603/603-621 operate between Ranam and Sŏngp'yŏng;
 Local trains 608/608-609, operating between Kŭndong and Sŏngp'yŏng, run on this line between Namgangdŏk and Sŏngp'yŏng.

Route
A yellow background in the "Distance" box indicates that section of the line is not electrified.

References

 Japanese Government Railways, 鉄道停車場一覧 昭和12年10月1日現在(The List of the Stations as of 1 October 1937), Kawaguchi Printing Company, Tokyo, 1937, pp 496, 498~501 (Japanese)

Railway lines in North Korea
Standard gauge railways in North Korea